Air pirates (or sky pirates) are a class of stock character from science fiction and fantasy.

Description
Such characters typically operate as pirates in the air, or, in general, the atmosphere of a planet, dwarf planet or moon, and travel by aircraft, as opposed to the more traditional pirates on the high seas, who travel by ship. However, just as traditional seafaring pirates target sailing ships, air pirates serve a similar role in science fiction and fantasy media: they capture and plunder aircraft and other targets for cargo, loot and occasionally steal an entire aircraft, sometimes killing the crew members in the process.

Their dress and speech may vary; it may correspond to the particular author's vision of the story's setting, rather than their seafaring counterparts, or they may be modeled after stereotypical sea pirates. Some air pirates are depicted using airborne aircraft carriers as mobile bases from which to conduct raids.

Air pirates made early appearances in novels of the late 19th century, as well as silent films, comics and pulp magazines, and have since appeared in a variety of media, including alternate history, steampunk, and dieselpunk works.

In popular culture

In reality
In real-life use, the phrase "air piracy" more often refers to the hijacking and illegal seizure of an aircraft. However, there has been at least one occasion of an act of nautical-type piracy being conducted from the air. This occurred in 1917, when the civilian Norwegian schooner Royal was boarded and captured by a boarding party from the German Zeppelin L23. 

There have also been a handful of instances where interceptor aircraft have threatened an airliner or cargo plane, forcing it to land, including cases like Ryanair Flight 4978 where the flight of the airliner was legal and approved; Irish prime minister Micheál Martin referred to the Ryanair incident as "piracy in the skies." In the notorious Airstan incident, an Ilyushin Il-76 shipping weapons to the besieged government of Afghanistan was attacked and forced to land by a Taliban-flown jet fighter. The cargo plane's crew spent a year in captivity before escaping.

See also

References

Sources
 

 
Stock characters